Xavi Fernández (born 12 February 1968) is a Spanish basketball player. He competed in the men's tournament at the 1992 Summer Olympics.

References

1968 births
Living people
Basketball players at the 1992 Summer Olympics
Basketball players from Barcelona
Baloncesto León players
Baloncesto Málaga players
CB Girona players
CB Gran Canaria players
FC Barcelona Bàsquet players
Liga ACB players
Olympic basketball players of Spain
Spanish men's basketball players